Eladio or Eládio is a given name, the Spanish equivalent of Helladius. Notable people with that name include.

Entertainment
Eládio Clímaco (born 1941), Portuguese television presenter
Eladio Lárez (born 1941), Venezuelan businessperson and TV presenter
Eladio Martínez (born 1912), Paraguay musician
Eladio Rodríguez (1864–1949), Spanish writer
Eladio Romero Santos (born 1937), Dominican musician
Eladio Torres (born 1950), Puerto Rican composer
Eladio Vélez (1897–1967), Colombian painter

Politics
Eladio Jala (born 1949) Filipino politician
Eladio Loizaga (born 1949), Paraguayan diplomat
Eladio Pérez (1956–2008), Dominican politician
Eladio Victoria (1864–1939), Dominican politician
Luis Eladio Pérez, Colombian politician

Religion
Eladio Acosta Arteaga (1916–2012), Colombian Roman Catholic bishop
Eladio Vicuña Aránguiz (1911–2008), Chilean Roman Catholic bishop
Eladio of Toledo (died 633), Christian archbishop

Sports
Eladio Benítez (1939–2018), Uruguayan footballer 
Eladio Campos (born 1936), Mexican racewalker
Eladio Fernández (born 1986), Spanish footballer
Eladio Herrera (boxer) (born 1930), Argentine boxer
Eladio Herrera (footballer) (born 1984), Chilean footballer
Eladio Jiménez (born 1976), Spanish cyclist
Eladio Reyes (born 1948), Peruvian footballer
Eladio Rodriguez (born 1979), Dominican baseball player
Eladio Rojas (1934–1991), Chilean footballer 
Eladio Rosabal Cordero (1894–1965), Costa Rican footballer
Eladio Sánchez (born 1984), Spanish cyclist
Eladio Silvestre (born 1940), Spanish footballer
Eladio Valdés (1905–1933), Cuban boxer 
Eladio Vallduvi (born 1950), Spanish sport shooter
Eladio Vaschetto, Argentine footballer
Eladio Zárate (born 1942), Paraguayan footballer

Other
Eladio Dieste (1917–2000), Uruguayan engineer and architect 
Don Eladio Sauza (1883–1946), Mexican businessman
Eladio Zorrilla Jiménez, known as Elady Zorrilla (born 1990), Spanish footballer

See also

Lalo (nickname)

Masculine given names